This is a table of volume of distribution (Vd) for various medication. For comparison, those with a Vd L/kg body weight of less than 0.2 are mainly distributed in blood plasma, 0.2-0.7 mostly in the extracellular fluid and those with more than 0.7 are distributed throughout total body water.

References & footnotes

Volume of distribution for drugs, Table
Pharmacokinetics